Martha was built in 1796. The British East India Company (EIC) chartered her for a voyage to Bengal. 

Captain Thomas Barnard was sworn into the EIC's service on 29 June 1796. He then acquired a letter of marque on 15 August 1796. He sailed from Portsmouth on 25 October 1796. Martha was lost on the Gasper Sand, Hooghli River, on 10 August 1797. Five lives were lost.

The EIC reported that it had no cargo aboard, and that Martha was lost "going on an expedition". This may have been the expedition that the British government had intended to mount against Manila in 1797–8. The EIC held several vessels in India to support the expedition.

Citations and references
Citations

References
 
 
 

1796 ships
Ships built in Rotherhithe
Ships of the British East India Company
Age of Sail merchant ships
Merchant ships of the United Kingdom
Maritime incidents in 1797
Shipwrecks in rivers
Shipwrecks of India